Ian Cuttler Sala (1971–2014) was a Mexican art director, photographer and graphic design artist.

Biography
Ian Cuttler was born in Mexico City, Mexico, in 1971. He lived with his brother Alex and two parents. His mother was crowned Miss Chile in 1968. He studied Bachelor of Fine Arts at the Art Center College of Design in Pasadena, California, (1991–1996). From 1991 to 1993 he co-owned Alebrije Estudio.  In 1996, he moved to New York, New York City where he worked for Sony Music from September 1996 to January 2006. As an Art Director he created visual art campaigns for artists like Beyoncé, Ricky Martin, Billy Joel, Mariah Carey, Julio Iglesias, Marc Anthony and Destiny's Child.

In 2000, he was nominated to the Grammy Award for the Best Boxed Recording Package for Louis Armstrong: "The Complete Hot Five And Hot Seven Recordings". He was awarded the Grammy for the Best Boxed Or Special Limited Edition Package for Johnny Cash's "The Legend" box set in the 48th Annual Grammy Awards. In January 2006, he left Sony Music to establish his own studio: Ian Cuttler Photography where he worked with prominent firms.

He died in a car accident in Los Angeles, California, on February 23, 2014.

Credits
Ian Cuttler had credits on the following records:

Awards and nominations
 2000 Grammy (Nomination) – Best Boxed Recording Package for Louis Armstrong: The Complete Hot Five And Hot Seven Recordings.
 2003 Alex Award (Winner) – Art Direction and design for Beyoncé: Dangerously in Love.
 2006 Grammy (winner) – Best Boxed Or Special Limited Edition Package for Johnny Cash's The Legend box set.

References

External links
 Ian Cuttler Photography Official Web site
 The Color Awards Masters Cup -Ian Cuttler Nominations

1971 births
2014 deaths
Mexican photographers
Grammy Award winners
Road incident deaths in California